Esperos Kallitheas B.C. is the men's basketball section of the Greek multi-sports club of Esperos Kallitheas (full name: POK Esperos/Panathlitikos Omilos Kallitheas Esperos). The basketball club was founded in 1945, two years after the establishment of the parent athletic club. The club has played six times in the top-tier level Greek Basket League, (the last time was in the 1999–2000 season).

History
Esperos Basketball Club was founded in 1945, thanks to the efforts of Takis Kontouzoglou. In the 1972–73 season, they played for first time in the top-tier level Greek first division. They also played in the Greek first division in another 5 seasons (in the 1978–79, 1980–81, 1982–83, 1989–90, and 1999–2000 seasons), making it six seasons in total that they played in Greece's first division, counting the 1972–73 season.

Esperos also won the Greek 2nd division championship once, in the 1998–99 season, and they have also won four Greek B League championships (Greek 3rd-tier), in 1978, 1980, 1982, and 1987.

Notable players

 Liveris Andritsos  
 Dimitris Dimakopoulos
 Makis Nikolaidis 
 Dimitrios Marmarinos  
 Giannis Giannoulis
 Alekos Petroulas
 Dimitrios Katiakos
 Spyros Magkounis
 Nikos Michalos
 Roy Tarpley
 Alvin Young

Head coaches
 Minas Gekos
 Antonis Mantzaris

Women's team
Esperos also had a women's basketball team. The women's team was one of the original founders of the successful club Esperides Kallitheas, that was founded in 1995. Esperides Kallitheas won 2 Greek Women's League championships, and 4 Greek Women's Cups. In 2012, the women's club merged with Ikaros Kallitheas, and ended its individual existence.

References

External links
Official website 
Eurobasket.com Team Page

Basketball teams in Attica
Basketball teams in Greece
Basketball teams established in 1945
Kallithea